Lycée Français International Marguerite Duras is a French international school in Long Binh, District 9, Ho Chi Minh City (Saigon). It is about 40 minutes from the centre of the city. It covers maternelle, through the final year of lycée (senior high school).

See also
Lycée français Alexandre Yersin – French international school in Hanoi

References

External links
  Lycée Français International Marguerite Duras

Ho Chi Minh
International schools in Ho Chi Minh City